Tylodina perversa, common names the "yellow tylodina" or "yellow umbrella slug", is a species of sea snail or false limpet, a marine opisthobranch gastropod mollusk in the family Tylodinidae.

This opisthobranch has a limpet-like shell which is composed primarily of protein, not calcium carbonate.

Distribution
This species of false limpet occurs in the northeastern Atlantic including the British Isles and the Mediterranean Sea.

Ecology
T. perversa feeds on the sponge species Aplysina aerophoba.

References 

 Sea Slug Forum info

External links
 

Tylodinidae
Gastropods described in 1791
Taxa named by Johann Friedrich Gmelin